Alvin Dean Jeffs (July 15, 1928 – January 21, 2018), was an American politician who was a Republican member of the Utah State Senate who eventually served as majority whip in the Utah Senate. Jeffs was an attorney at the law firm of Jeffs & Jeffs, P.C. in Provo Utah, he was a veteran of the Korean War, serving in the Counter Intelligence Corp, and he was an alumnus of University of Utah and Brigham Young University. He was sworn into the Utah Bar in 1958.

References

1928 births
2018 deaths
Republican Party Utah state senators
Politicians from Provo, Utah
Utah lawyers
Utah State University alumni
Brigham Young University alumni